Sulfotransferase 1C3, also known as ST1C3, is an enzyme that in humans is encoded by the SULT1C3 gene.

Function 

Sulfotransferase enzymes catalyze the sulfate conjugation of many hormones, neurotransmitters, drugs, and xenobiotic compounds. These cytosolic enzymes are different in their tissue distributions and substrate specificities. The gene structure (number and length of exons) is similar among family members.

Clinical significance 

ST1C3 sulfates large benzylic alcohols such as 1-hydroxymethyl-pyrene to chemically reactive mutagenic sulpho conjugates.

See also 
 Alcohol sulfotransferase

References

External links 
 PDBe-KB provides an overview of all the structure information available in the PDB for Human Sulfotransferase 1C3 (SULT1C3)